Little Neck is a station on the Long Island Rail Road's Port Washington Branch in the Little Neck neighborhood of Queens, New York City. The station is at Little Neck Parkway and 39th Road, about half a mile (800 m) north of Northern Boulevard. Little Neck station is 14.5 miles (23.3 km) from Penn Station in Midtown Manhattan, and is the easternmost station on the Port Washington Branch in New York City. The station house is located on the south (eastbound) side, unlike most station houses on the Port Washington Branch. The station is part of the CityTicket program and is in Zone 3.

Little Neck Parkway at the west end of the station crosses the line at the only at-grade railroad crossing on the Port Washington Branch, and one of the few remaining in New York City. It is regarded as one of the most dangerous railroad crossings in the city, as the other crossings carry few trains, usually only freight trains (such as on the Montauk Branch west of Jamaica station and the Bushwick Branch, both un-electrified).

History
The original station house was built between February and May 1870 by the Flushing and North Side Railroad, and is one of only two built by the F&NS along the Port Washington Branch. The depot was built on the south side of the tracks and east of Little Neck Parkway. The station cost $1,500. The station opened in June 1870 as Little Neck, superseding earlier Little Neck station, which reverted to the name of Douglaston. It was replaced by the Long Island City and Flushing Railroad in 1890 with a second station house. The former F&NS depot is now located on a local street off Northern Boulevard. Electric lights were installed in the station in February 1910.

Automatic gates and high level platforms were installed by 1978.

There is a pedestrian overpass at mid-platform links the eastbound and westbound platforms. This overpass was closed and was demolished in September 2016 even though it was refurbished in 1989. It was replaced by a prefabricated span in December 2016.

Station layout

The station has two at-grade high-level side platforms, each 10 cars long, with a crossover staircase connecting them.

References

External links

Little Neck Parkway RR Crossing photo (Unofficial LIRR History Website)
Little Neck Parkway & Sandhill Road Railroad Crossing (Forgotten NY.com)
Little Neck Station (Bridge and Tunnel Club)
 Station House from Google Maps Street View
Platforms from Google Maps Street View (Daytime)
Platforms from Google Maps Street View (Night) 
Inside station house/ waiting room from Google Maps Street View

Railway stations in Queens, New York
Long Island Rail Road stations in New York City
Railway stations in the United States opened in 1870
1870 establishments in New York (state)
Douglaston–Little Neck, Queens